Plymouth Athenaeum, located in Plymouth, England, is a society dedicated to the promotion of learning in the fields of science, technology, literature and art.

The Athenaeum building, located at Derry's Cross in Plymouth City Centre, includes a 340-seat auditorium and a local interest library.

History

Founded on 17 October 1812 as the Plymouth Institute, it was soon renamed the Plymouth Institution. The first meetings took place in Catherine Street and later Frankfort Street Art Gallery.

Architect and founding member of the Institution John Foulston, who had won a competition to design the Royal Hotel and Theatre group of buildings, designed the building that would become the permanent home of the organisation.

The foundation stone of the Athenaeum, which had a Greek Doric-style facade, was laid on 1 May 1818.

The Devon and Cornwall Natural History Society, formed in 1838, amalgamated with the Plymouth Institution in 1851. The Mechanics' Institute in Princes Street closed in 1899 and a merger with the Plymouth Institution took place.

Foulston's original Athenaeum was destroyed during The Blitz in 1941, resulting in the loss of the Institution's library, art and museum collections.

The Institution was renamed the Plymouth Athenaeum when it moved into its present building on 1 June 1961, which is located on almost the exact location of its pre-Blitz home.

Library

Before the Blitz, the Athenaeum library was home to more than 10,000 volumes on topics including science and natural history dating back to the early years of the society in the early 19th century.

The library was restored as part of the rebuilt Athenaeum in 1961 and is a full member of the Association of Independent Libraries.

Lectures and talks

During its history, The Plymouth Athenaeum has played host to a number of high-profile lecturers, speakers and guests. These included broadcasters John Snagge and Edgar Lustgarten, Church of England envoy Terry Waite and artist Robert Lenkiewicz.

On a more local level, a regular contributor was local historian and academic Mr F S Blight (also a Plymouth headmaster). His presentations included Hail & Farewell to Devonport 1951, Popular Art in Plymouth 1953, Stoke & Morice Town 1951, and Captain Tobias Furneaux 1952. All these talks were released as printed booklets.

Theatre

The rebuilt Athenaeum building included a theatre, being very popular with local dancing schools and Amateur Dramatic groups until its closure due to financial problems in 2009 .

Performers who took to the stage at the Athenaeum included actress Maggie Steed and poet Pam Ayres. In 1971, with the co-operation of the British Film Institute, a film theatre was created with the construction of a projection room on the roof. Present at the opening night were Malcolm McDowell, Bryan Forbes and Nanette Newman.

The theatre was relaunched in 2016 and opened in 2017. This was made possible through a collaboration with the local Barbican Theatre, a Social Enterprise Investment Fund grant and loan from Plymouth City Council. In 2019 it was announced that The Barbican Theatre and The Plymouth Athenaeum had come together to form the PL1 Partnership, led by directors from both organisations, working together to bring the venue into public use.

The Beatles

On 13 November 1963, the English rock band The Beatles played at the ABC Cinema, next to the Athenaeum. The band were rushed in and out of the Athenaeum to avoid the crowds of screaming fans gathered outside the cinema. They returned to play the ABC Cinema on 29 October 1964, and were escorted through a tunnel which connected the Athenaeum with Westward Television, who had been filming them from the Lyneham Inn, on the outskirts of Plymouth. At the end of the concert, and following a short delay, the band were driven away from Westward's studios.

Bicentenary

The Athenaeum celebrated its bicentenary in 2012 with an open week of activities and the publication of a book charting its 200-year history.

Notable members

Notable members of the Plymouth Institution or Plymouth Athenaeum include:

References

External links

Plymouth Athenaeum Official website

1812 establishments in England
Buildings and structures in Plymouth, Devon
Buildings and structures in the United Kingdom destroyed during World War II
Doric Greek
Education in Devon
Educational institutions established in 1812
John Foulston buildings
Regional and local learned societies of the United Kingdom
Libraries in Devon
Theatres in Devon